Sir Joseph John Thomson  (18 December 1856 – 30 August 1940) was a British physicist and Nobel Laureate in Physics, credited with the discovery of the electron, the first subatomic particle to be discovered.

In 1897, Thomson showed that cathode rays were composed of previously unknown negatively charged particles (now called electrons), which he calculated must have bodies much smaller than atoms and a very large charge-to-mass ratio. Thomson is also credited with finding the first evidence for isotopes of a stable (non-radioactive) element in 1913, as part of his exploration into the composition of canal rays (positive ions). His experiments to determine the nature of positively charged particles, with Francis William Aston, were the first use of mass spectrometry and led to the development of the mass spectrograph.

Thomson was awarded the 1906 Nobel Prize in Physics for his work on the conduction of electricity in gases. 
Thomson was also a teacher, and several of his students also went on to win Nobel Prizes.

Education and personal life
Joseph John Thomson was born on 18 December 1856 in Cheetham Hill, Manchester, Lancashire, England. His mother, Emma Swindells, came from a local textile family. His father, Joseph James Thomson, ran an antiquarian bookshop founded by Thomson's great-grandfather. He had a brother, Frederick Vernon Thomson, who was two years younger than he was. J. J. Thomson was a reserved yet devout Anglican.

His early education was in small private schools where he demonstrated outstanding talent and interest in science. In 1870, he was admitted to Owens College in Manchester (now University of Manchester) at the unusually young age of 14 and came under the influence of Balfour Stewart, Professor of Physics, who initiated Thomson into physical research. Thomson began experimenting with contact electrification and soon published his first scientific paper. His parents planned to enroll him as an apprentice engineer to Sharp, Stewart & Co, a locomotive manufacturer, but these plans were cut short when his father died in 1873.

He moved on to Trinity College, Cambridge, in 1876. In 1880, he obtained his Bachelor of Arts degree in mathematics (Second Wrangler in the Tripos and 2nd Smith's Prize).  He applied for and became a Fellow of Trinity College in 1881.  Thomson received his Master of Arts degree (with Adams Prize) in 1883.

Family
In 1890, Thomson married Rose Elisabeth Paget.  Beginning in 1882, women could attend demonstrations and lectures at the University of Cambridge.  Rose Paget, daughter of Sir George Edward Paget, a physician and then Regius Professor of Physic at Cambridge at the church of St. Mary the Less, was interested in physics. She attended demonstrations and lectures, among them Thomson's.  Their relationship developed from there.

They had two children: George Paget Thomson, who was also awarded a Nobel Prize for his work on the wave properties of the electron, and Joan Paget Thomson (later Charnock), who became an author, writing children's books, non-fiction and biographies.

Career and research

Overview
On 22 December 1884, Thomson was appointed Cavendish Professor of Physics at the University of Cambridge. The appointment caused considerable surprise, given that candidates such as Osborne Reynolds or Richard Glazebrook were older and more experienced in laboratory work.  Thomson was known for his work as a mathematician, where he was recognized as an exceptional talent.

He was awarded a Nobel Prize in 1906, "in recognition of the great merits of his theoretical and experimental investigations on the conduction of electricity by gases." He was knighted in 1908 and appointed to the Order of Merit in 1912. In 1914, he gave the Romanes Lecture in Oxford on "The atomic theory". In 1918, he became Master of Trinity College, Cambridge, where he remained until his death. Joseph John Thomson died on 30 August 1940; his ashes rest in Westminster Abbey, near the graves of Sir Isaac Newton and his former student, Ernest Rutherford.

One of Thomson's students was Ernest Rutherford, who later succeeded him as Cavendish Professor of Physics. Six of Thomson's research assistants and junior colleagues (Charles Glover Barkla, Niels Bohr, Max Born, William Henry Bragg, Owen Willans Richardson and Charles Thomson Rees Wilson) won Nobel Prizes in physics, and two (Francis William Aston and Ernest Rutherford) won Nobel prizes in chemistry. Thomson's son (George Paget Thomson) also won the 1937 Nobel Prize in physics for proving the wave-like properties of electrons.

Early work
Thomson's prize-winning master's work, Treatise on the motion of vortex rings, shows his early interest in atomic structure.  In it, Thomson mathematically described the motions of William Thomson's vortex theory of atoms.
 
Thomson published a number of papers addressing both mathematical and experimental issues of electromagnetism.  He examined the electromagnetic theory of light of James Clerk Maxwell, introduced the concept of electromagnetic mass of a charged particle, and demonstrated that a moving charged body would apparently increase in mass.

Much of his work in mathematical modelling of chemical processes can be thought of as early computational chemistry. In further work, published in book form as Applications of dynamics to physics and chemistry (1888), Thomson addressed the transformation of energy in mathematical and theoretical terms, suggesting that all energy might be kinetic. His next book, Notes on recent researches in electricity and magnetism (1893), built upon Maxwell's Treatise upon electricity and magnetism, and was sometimes referred to as "the third volume of Maxwell". In it, Thomson emphasized physical methods and experimentation and included extensive figures and diagrams of apparatus, including a number for the passage of electricity through gases. His third book, Elements of the mathematical theory of electricity and magnetism (1895) was a readable introduction to a wide variety of subjects, and achieved considerable popularity as a textbook.

A series of four lectures, given by Thomson on a visit to Princeton University in 1896, were subsequently published as Discharge of electricity through gases (1897).  Thomson also presented a series of six lectures at Yale University in 1904.

Discovery of the electron
Several scientists, such as William Prout and Norman Lockyer, had suggested that atoms were built up from a more fundamental unit, but they envisioned this unit to be the size of the smallest atom, hydrogen. Thomson in 1897 was the first to suggest that one of the fundamental units of the atom was more than 1,000 times smaller than an atom, suggesting the subatomic particle now known as the electron. Thomson discovered this through his explorations on the properties of cathode rays. Thomson made his suggestion on 30 April 1897 following his discovery that cathode rays (at the time known as Lenard rays) could travel much further through air than expected for an atom-sized particle. He estimated the mass of cathode rays by measuring the heat generated when the rays hit a thermal junction and comparing this with the magnetic deflection of the rays. His experiments suggested not only that cathode rays were over 1,000 times lighter than the hydrogen atom, but also that their mass was the same in whichever type of atom they came from. He concluded that the rays were composed of very light, negatively charged particles which were a universal building block of atoms. He called the particles "corpuscles", but later scientists preferred the name electron which had been suggested by George Johnstone Stoney in 1891, prior to Thomson's actual discovery.

In April 1897, Thomson had only early indications that the cathode rays could be deflected electrically (previous investigators such as Heinrich Hertz had thought they could not be). A month after Thomson's announcement of the corpuscle, he found that he could reliably deflect the rays by an electric field if he evacuated the discharge tube to a very low pressure. By comparing the deflection of a beam of cathode rays by electric and magnetic fields he obtained more robust measurements of the mass-to-charge ratio that confirmed his previous estimates. This became the classic means of measuring the charge-to-mass ratio of the electron.  (The charge itself was not measured until Robert A. Millikan's oil drop experiment in 1909.)

Thomson believed that the corpuscles emerged from the atoms of the trace gas inside his cathode ray tubes. He thus concluded that atoms were divisible, and that the corpuscles were their building blocks. In 1904, Thomson suggested a model of the atom, hypothesizing that it was a sphere of positive matter within which electrostatic forces determined the positioning of the corpuscles.  To explain the overall neutral charge of the atom, he proposed that the corpuscles were distributed in a uniform sea of positive charge.  In this "plum pudding model", the electrons were seen as embedded in the positive charge like raisins in a plum pudding (although in Thomson's model they were not stationary, but orbiting rapidly).

Thomson made the discovery around the same time that Walter Kaufmann and Emil Wiechert discovered the correct mass to charge ratio of these cathode rays (electrons).

Isotopes and mass spectrometry

In 1912, as part of his exploration into the composition of the streams of positively charged particles then known as canal rays, Thomson and his research assistant F. W. Aston channelled a stream of neon ions through a magnetic and an electric field and measured its deflection by placing a photographic plate in its path. They observed two patches of light on the photographic plate (see image on right), which suggested two different parabolas of deflection, and concluded that neon is composed of atoms of two different atomic masses (neon-20 and neon-22), that is to say of two isotopes. This was the first evidence for isotopes of a stable element; Frederick Soddy had previously proposed the existence of isotopes to explain the decay of certain radioactive elements.

J. J. Thomson's separation of neon isotopes by their mass was the first example of mass spectrometry, which was subsequently improved and developed into a general method by F. W. Aston and by A. J. Dempster.

Experiments with cathode rays
Earlier, physicists debated whether cathode rays were immaterial like light ("some process in the aether") or were "in fact wholly material, and ... mark the paths of particles of matter charged with negative electricity", quoting Thomson. The aetherial hypothesis was vague, but the particle hypothesis was definite enough for Thomson to test.

Magnetic deflection
Thomson first investigated the magnetic deflection of cathode rays. Cathode rays were produced in the side tube on the left of the apparatus and passed through the anode into the main bell jar, where they were deflected by a magnet. Thomson detected their path by the fluorescence on a squared screen in the jar. He found that whatever the material of the anode and the gas in the jar, the deflection of the rays was the same, suggesting that the rays were of the same form whatever their origin.

Electrical charge 

While supporters of the aetherial theory accepted the possibility that negatively charged particles are produced in Crookes tubes, they believed that they are a mere by-product and that the cathode rays themselves are immaterial. Thomson set out to investigate whether or not he could actually separate the charge from the rays.

Thomson constructed a Crookes tube with an electrometer set to one side, out of the direct path of the cathode rays. Thomson could trace the path of the ray by observing the phosphorescent patch it created where it hit the surface of the tube. Thomson observed that the electrometer registered a charge only when he deflected the cathode ray to it with a magnet. He concluded that the negative charge and the rays were one and the same.

Electrical deflection

In May–June 1897, Thomson investigated whether or not the rays could be deflected by an electric field. Previous experimenters had failed to observe this, but Thomson believed their experiments were flawed because their tubes contained too much gas.

Thomson constructed a Crookes tube with a better vacuum. At the start of the tube was the cathode from which the rays projected. The rays were sharpened to a beam by two metal slits – the first of these slits doubled as the anode, the second was connected to the earth. The beam then passed between two parallel aluminium plates, which produced an electric field between them when they were connected to a battery. The end of the tube was a large sphere where the beam would impact on the glass, created a glowing patch. Thomson pasted a scale to the surface of this sphere to measure the deflection of the beam. Any electron beam would collide with some residual gas atoms within the Crookes tube, thereby ionizing them and producing electrons and ions in the tube (space charge); in previous experiments this space charge electrically screened the externally applied electric field. However, in Thomson's Crookes tube the density of residual atoms was so low that the space charge from the electrons and ions was insufficient to electrically screen the externally applied electric field, which permitted Thomson to successfully observe electrical deflection.

When the upper plate was connected to the negative pole of the battery and the lower plate to the positive pole, the glowing patch moved downwards, and when the polarity was reversed, the patch moved upwards.

Measurement of mass-to-charge ratio

In his classic experiment, Thomson measured the mass-to-charge ratio of the cathode rays by measuring how much they were deflected by a magnetic field and comparing this with the electric deflection. He used the same apparatus as in his previous experiment, but placed the discharge tube between the poles of a large electromagnet. He found that the mass-to-charge ratio was over a thousand times lower than that of a hydrogen ion (H+), suggesting either that the particles were very light and/or very highly charged.  Significantly, the rays from every cathode yielded the same mass-to-charge ratio. This is in contrast to anode rays (now known to arise from positive ions emitted by the anode), where the mass-to-charge ratio varies from anode-to-anode.  Thomson himself remained critical of what his work established, in his Nobel Prize acceptance speech referring to "corpuscles" rather than "electrons".

Thomson's calculations can be summarised as follows (in his original notation, using F instead of E for the electric field and H instead of B for the magnetic field):

The magnetic field was varied until the magnetic and electric deflections were the same, when  . This can be simplified to give . The electric deflection was measured separately to give Θ and H, F and l were known, so m/e could be calculated.

Conclusions

As to the source of these particles, Thomson believed they emerged from the molecules of gas in the vicinity of the cathode.

Thomson imagined the atom as being made up of these corpuscles orbiting in a sea of positive charge; this was his plum pudding model. This model was later proved incorrect when his student Ernest Rutherford showed that the positive charge is concentrated in the nucleus of the atom.

Other work
In 1905, Thomson discovered the natural radioactivity of potassium.

In 1906, Thomson demonstrated that hydrogen had only a single electron per atom. Previous theories allowed various numbers of electrons.

Awards and honours

During his life

Thomson was elected a Fellow of the Royal Society (FRS) and appointed to the Cavendish Professorship of Experimental Physics at the Cavendish Laboratory, University of Cambridge in 1884. Thomson won numerous awards and honours during his career including:
 Adams Prize (1882)
 Royal Medal (1894)
 Hughes Medal (1902)
 Hodgkins Medal (1902)
 Nobel Prize for Physics (1906)
 Elliott Cresson Medal (1910)
 Copley Medal (1914)
 Franklin Medal (1922)

Thomson was elected a Fellow of the Royal Society on 12 June 1884 and served as President of the Royal Society from 1915 to 1920.

In November 1927, J. J. Thomson opened the Thomson building, named in his honour, in the Leys School, Cambridge.

Posthumous honours
In 1991, the thomson (symbol: Th) was proposed as a unit to measure mass-to-charge ratio in mass spectrometry in his honour.

J J Thomson Avenue, on the University of Cambridge's West Cambridge site, is named after Thomson.

The Thomson Medal Award, sponsored by the International Mass Spectrometry Foundation, is named after Thomson.

The Institute of Physics Joseph Thomson Medal and Prize is named after Thomson.

See also
 List of presidents of the Royal Society

References

Bibliography

 1883. A Treatise on the Motion of Vortex Rings: An essay to which the Adams Prize was adjudged in 1882, in the University of Cambridge. London: Macmillan and Co., pp. 146. Recent reprint: .
 1888. Applications of Dynamics to Physics and Chemistry. London: Macmillan and Co., pp. 326. Recent reprint: .
 1893. Notes on recent researches in electricity and magnetism: intended as a sequel to Professor Clerk-Maxwell's 'Treatise on Electricity and Magnetism. Oxford University Press, pp.xvi and 578. 1991, Cornell University Monograph: .
 
 
 Thomson, Joseph John (1904). Electricity and matter (in English). Oxford : Clarendon Press.
 
 
 1921 (1895). Elements Of The Mathematical Theory Of Electricity And Magnetism. London: Macmillan and Co. Scan of 1895 edition.
 A Text book of Physics in Five Volumes, co-authored with J.H. Poynting: (1) Properties of Matter, (2) Sound, (3) Heat, (4) Light, and (5) Electricity and Magnetism. Dated 1901 and later, and with revised later editions.
 Dahl, Per F., "Flash of the Cathode Rays: A History of J.J. Thomson's Electron". Institute of Physics Publishing. June 1997. 
 J.J. Thomson (1897) "Cathode Rays", The Electrician 39, 104, also published in Proceedings of the Royal Institution 30 April 1897, 1–14—first announcement of the "corpuscle" (before the classic mass and charge experiment)
 J.J. Thomson (1897), Cathode rays, Philosophical Magazine, 44, 293—The classic measurement of the electron mass and charge
 J.J. Thomson (1904), "On the Structure of the Atom: an Investigation of the Stability and Periods of Oscillation of a number of Corpuscles arranged at equal intervals around the Circumference of a Circle; with Application of the Results to the Theory of Atomic Structure," Philosophical Magazine Series 6, Volume 7, Number 39, pp. 237–265. This paper presents the classical "plum pudding model" from which the Thomson Problem is posed.
 
 J.J. Thomson (1912), "Further experiments on positive rays" Philosophical Magazine, 24, 209–253—first announcement of the two neon parabolae
 J.J. Thomson (1913), Rays of positive electricity, Proceedings of the Royal Society, A 89, 1–20—Discovery of neon isotopes
 J.J. Thomson (1923), The Electron in Chemistry: Being Five Lectures Delivered at the Franklin Institute, Philadelphia.
 Thomson, Sir J. J. (1936), Recollections and Reflections, London: G. Bell & Sons, Ltd. Republished as digital edition, Cambridge: University Press, 2011 (Cambridge Library Collection series).
 Thomson, George Paget. (1964) J.J. Thomson: Discoverer of the Electron. Great Britain: Thomas Nelson & Sons, Ltd.
 Davis, Eward Arthur & Falconer, Isobel (1997), J.J. Thomson and the Discovery of the Electron. 
 Falconer, Isobel (1988) "J.J. Thomson's Work on Positive Rays, 1906–1914" Historical Studies in the Physical and Biological Sciences 18(2) 265–310
 Falconer, Isobel (2001) "Corpuscles to Electrons" in J Buchwald and A Warwick (eds) Histories of the Electron, Cambridge, Mass: MIT Press, pp. 77–100.

External links

 The Discovery of the Electron 
  with the Nobel Lecture, 11 December 1906 Carriers of Negative Electricity
 Annotated bibliography for Joseph J. Thomson from the Alsos Digital Library for Nuclear Issues
 Essay on Thomson life and religious views
 The Cathode Ray Tube site
 Thomson's discovery of the isotopes of Neon
 Photos of some of Thomson's remaining apparatus at the Cavendish Laboratory Museum
 A short film of Thomson lecturing on electrical engineering and the discovery of the electron (1934)
 
 
A history of the electron: JJ and GP Thomson published by the University of the Basque Country (2013)

1856 births
1940 deaths
20th-century British  physicists
Alumni of Trinity College, Cambridge
Burials at Westminster Abbey
English Anglicans
20th-century British mathematicians
British Nobel laureates
Experimental physicists
Fellows of the Royal Society
Foreign associates of the National Academy of Sciences
Masters of Trinity College, Cambridge
Members of the Order of Merit
Nobel laureates in Physics
People from Cheetham Hill
Presidents of the Royal Society
Recipients of the Copley Medal
Royal Medal winners
Knights Bachelor
Second Wranglers
Alumni of the Victoria University of Manchester
Presidents of the British Science Association
Presidents of the Institute of Physics
Presidents of the Physical Society
Mass spectrometrists
Recipients of the Dalton Medal
Cavendish Professors of Physics